Loban is a surname. Notable people with the surname include:

Stanislav Loban (born 1977), Ukrainian footballer
Serguei Loban, Russian film director
Noel Loban, English wrestler

Hamoi stands also for Styrax (tree) or the balsamic resin won from this tree, Benzoin resin.